Sahana may refer to:

 Sahana (raga), a rāga in Carnatic music
 Sahana (TV series)
 Sahana, Hooghly, a village in West Bengal, India
 Sahana Software Foundation, an organization promoting free and open-source software (FOSS) for disaster and emergency management
 People named Sahana:
 Sahana Bajpaie
 Sahana Bajracharya
 Sahana Devi
 Sahana Kumari
 Sahana Pradhan